Stewart MacLaren (born 6 April 1953 in Larkhall) is a Scottish former footballer who played in central defence. MacLaren played for Motherwell, Dundee and Heart of Midlothian. He was known by the nicknames Chopper and Gonzo. After retiring in 1985 through injury he pursued a career in the motor trade.

External links

1953 births
Living people
Scottish footballers
Motherwell F.C. players
Dundee F.C. players
Heart of Midlothian F.C. players
Scottish Football League players
Association football fullbacks
Sportspeople from Larkhall
Footballers from South Lanarkshire